Literature from North East India refers to literature in the languages of North East India and the body of work by English-language writers from this region. North East India is an under-represented region in many ways. The troubled political climate, the beautiful landscape and the confluence of various ethnic groups perhaps have given rise to a body of writing that is completely different from Indian English literature. North-East India was a colonial construct and continues to be one by virtue of having a historically difficult relationship with the Indian nation state.

Debates surrounding the term North East
There is no single definition of the phrase "literature from North East India", as the diversity of this region defies easy definition. Broadly, this phrase refers mostly to English writing but may also include Assamese literature and writings in the Meitei language, that have long traditions of writing and stand on their own with a glorious legacy.

Many writers such as Harekrishna Deka and Temsula Ao have expressed discomfort with the term North-East India and North Eastern writers, respectively. A section also strongly argue that the term is colonial and, hence, an artificial construct. There is nothing called a "north-easterner" and the concept is purely geographical; it tends to homogenise an extremely heterogeneous cluster of people, as there exists no common history and heritage of the people in North-East India; however, the current states of Arunachal Pradesh, Mizoram and Meghalaya used to be constituent states of former British Assam.

Recent interest
Since 2008, national magazines and journals have taken unprecedented amount of interest in writings from this region. Several national news magazines have featured special issues on writers from the North East. The profusion of literature from North East has also generated immense interest within and outside the nation.

Mitra Phukan, Bhabananda Deka, Dhruba Hazarika, Temsula Ao, Mamang Dai, Arnab Jan Deka, Jahnavi Barua, Anjum Hasan, Siddhartha Deb, Robin S Ngangom, Kynpham Sing Nongkymrih, Desmond L Kharmawphlang, Nabina Das, Uddipana Goswami, Nitoo Das, Manash Pratim Borah, Prodyut Kumar Deka and Ananya S Guha are some English-language writers from North East. Assamese writers and Indian top literary award Jnanpith winners Dr Birendra Kumar Bhattacharya, who was also President of India's top literary body Sahitya Academy, and Dr Indira Goswami, alias Mamoni Raisom Goswami, were the most famous literary figures to emerge from this region. 'NELive' selected Dr Mamoni Raisom Goswami together with Homen Borgohain, Nirupama Borgohain, Mitra Phukan and Arnab Jan Deka as the '5 Contemporary Writers from Assam who made it big outside the state' and also illustrated their individual literary credentials.

Literary awards

Meitei literature 
 Meitei literature (alias Manipuri literature) 
 Sahitya Akademi awards
 Sahitya Akademi Award for Meitei
 Sahitya Akademi Translation Prize for Meitei
 Yuva Puraskar for Meitei
 Patriotic Writers' Forum awards
 Pacha Meetei Literary Award 
 R Kathing Tangkhul Literary Award 
 Dr Saroj Nalini Parratt Literary Award

Critical responses
The younger generation of English-language writers From North-East India include Jahnavi Barua, Arnab Jan Deka, Siddhartha Sarma, Nitoo Das, Janice Pariat, Nabanita Kanungo, Mona Zote, Ankush Saikia, Bijoya Sawian and Uddipana Goswami. These writers express strong political awareness by addressing issues such as identity and ethnicity; a few hailing from Assam interrogate the violence that has ravaged their home state Assam due to the tussle between the secessionist militant group ULFA and the Indian government in complex ways. Some of them like Arnab Jan Deka delved deep into the spiritual and intellectual heritage along the Brahmaputra valley, and also highlighted its environmental fragility.

Discussing the work of the new generation of writers from North East, Preeti Gill says, "Many younger writers continue to grapple with these issues. Having grown up in the shadow of the gun, their desire to analyse the common people’s reaction to insurgency is as strong as ever."

Literary journal Pratilipi adumbrates the issues that concern writers from North East India in its special feature, "It is tragic that the long-running unrest, violence and terrorism in the North-East has remained a mere digression in the mainstream of the Indian nation-state – ironically, even in the mainstream arts that otherwise come across as very charged and political. The poems by Uddipana Goswami and six poets translated by Tarun Bhartiya, along with stories by Mitra Phukan and Srutimala Duara serve as a reminder that the "North-East" is not a geographical, political unit, but a place of many languages and cultures.".

The internationally acclaimed iconic journal Art of Living Guide edited by Spain-based novelist, screenwriter and philanthropist Claire Elizabeth Terry, which carries regular columns by several Nobel laureates like Mikhail Gorbachev, Dalai Lama and Camilo Jose Sela, published a special essay of popular British poet and environmentalist Tess Joyce on the aesthetics of philosophical realms and lifestyle on the Banks of Brahmaputra in Assam by highlighting Arnab Jan Deka's book of poetry A Stanza of Sunlight on the Banks of Brahmaputra, which says, "Written during his high school years, Arnab’s poems plunged the reader into further depths – into the midst of the universe itself and the riverine landscapes only served to increase the levels of complexity the narrator saw; we are left to realise that no-one is big enough to hold the universe and so: "Yet with no empty space left on the boat/the Universe sat quietly beside the reeds." Imbibed with a sense of awe, the narrator’s desires for explanations disappeared – it was the poetry that satisfied him, hence: "On the bald head of the dusty earth/Ashwaklanta bestowed a stanza of sunlight." A more extensive version of this literary masterpiece on literature from North East India also found a place of pride in the London-based research journal Luit to Thames. In the prestigious Delhi-based journal The Book Review, critic and poet N Kalyani admires Arnab Jan Deka's poetry from the same book, "And in These Small Thoughts Deka reveals what Umananda is, 'A tiny river island amidst the mighty river Brahmaputra near the prehistoric city of Pragjyotishpur, known by its modern name Guwahati now,' in a way that brings the image so alive: The tiny rivulet reflect a myriad of colour/The distant Umananda--a majestic aloof lily pad/The blackish riverbank with flowing wind/The cities dreaming of fleeced nomad/Besides the tidal marina."

List of writers from North-East India
 Ananda Chandra Agarwala
 Ananda Chandra Barua
 Ananda Ram Baruah
 Ankush Saikia
 Anuradha Sharma Pujari
 Arupa Kalita Patangia
 Arup Kumar Dutta
 Amulya Barua
 Atul Chandra Hazarika
 Banikanta Kakati
 Bhabananda Deka
 Bhabendra Nath Saikia
 Birendra Kumar Bhattacharya
 Birinchi Kumar Barua
 Brajanath Sarma
 Chandra Kumar Agarwala
 Daisy Hasan
 Dhrubajyoti Bora
 Dhruba Hazarika
 Easterine Kire
 Dimbeswar Neog
 Harekrishna Deka
 Hem Chandra Barua
 Hem Chandra Goswami
 Hem Barua
 Hem Barua (Tyagbir)
 Hiren Gohain
 Homen Borgohain
 Irom Chanu Sharmila
 Jahnavi Barua
 Janice Pariat
 Jogesh Das
 Jyoti Prasad Agarwala
 Kaliram Medhi
 Kamalakanta Bhattacharya
 Krishna Kanta Handique
 Kochery C Shibu
 Laksminath Bezbarua
 Maharaj Kumari Binodini Devi
 Malsawmi Jacob
 Mamang Dai
 Mamoni Raisom Goswami
 Mithinga Daimary
 Mitra Phukan
 Nalini Bala Devi
 Nalini Prava Deka
 Navakanta Barua
 Nirmal Prabha Bordoloi
 Padmanath Gohain Baruah
 Parag Kumar Das
 Phani Sarma
 Prodyut Kumar Deka
 Raghunath Choudhari
 Rita Chowdhury
 Rongbong Terang
 Rumi Laskar Bora
 Saurabh Kumar Chaliha
 Siddhartha Sarma
 Srutimala Duara
 Surya Kumar Bhuyan
 Tanupriya Kalita

See also
 Assamese literature
 Meitei literature
 Indian English literature
 Indian literature
 Insurgency in Northeast India
 Mizo literature
 The Land of Early Nightfall: Glimpses of the Literature of Northeast India

References

External links
 Singing in the Dark Times, in Tehelka, by Preeti Gill
 Poetry and the Brahmaputra : Flowing Back to Nature, in Art of Living Guide, by Tess Joyce
 Songs of the Hills, in Mint Lounge, by Anindita Ghose 
 Political Literature from India's North East, by Manjeet Barua
 Poetry by the Banks, in The Assam Tribune, by Arindam Barooah
 Poetry For Rhyme And Reason, in The Book Review, by N. Kalyani
 Top 5 Contemporary Writers from Assam, in NELive, by Arnab Ghosh
 New generation of storytellers, by Anwesha Roy Choudhury
 North-East India on Facebook
 Arjun Choudhuri's Blog
 ebooks of North-East India
 Manash Pratim Borah's Blog

Northeast India
Indian literature
 
Writers from Northeast India